Torstein Dahle (born 20 February 1947) is a Norwegian politician and economist. He works at the Bergen University College and represents Red Party in the city council of Bergen. Dahle was born in Oslo.

At age 14, Dahle joined Lambertseter Youth Conservatives (Unge Høyre). He attended Oslo Cathedral School and Oslo Commerce School. After moving to Bergen in 1966 he moved to the far left and co-founded the Maoist group AKP(m-l) in the early 1970s. He remained in the party until 1997.

From 2003 to 2007, Dahle led the AKP(m-l)-initiated Red Electoral Alliance, which he had also helped establish. He continued on to lead the Red Party, a 2007 merger of AKP(m-l) and the Red Electoral Alliance. In 2010, he was succeeded as Red Party leader by Turid Thomassen. 

Dahle is openly homosexual since the late 1960s.

References 

1947 births
Living people
Norwegian communists
Politicians from Bergen
Red Party (Norway) politicians
Leaders of political parties in Norway
Academic staff of the Western Norway University of Applied Sciences
Norwegian School of Economics alumni
People educated at Oslo Cathedral School
Gay politicians
Norwegian LGBT politicians
Norwegian economists